Sırt Yenigicə (also, Çırt-Yengica, Syrt Yengidzha, and Syrt-Yenidzhe) is a village and municipality in the Qabala Rayon of Azerbaijan.  It has a population of 400.

References 

Populated places in Qabala District